Homagnostus is a genus of trilobite in the order Agnostida, which existed in what is now north Wales. It was described by Howell in 1935. The genus was originally considered to be Agnostus pisiformis var. obesus (Belt, 1867).

References

Agnostidae
Fossils of Wales
Paleozoic life of Alberta
Paleozoic life of British Columbia
Paleozoic life of Newfoundland and Labrador
Paleozoic life of Yukon
Paleozoic United Kingdom

Paleontology in Wales